Gordan Irović (2 July 1934 – 26 May 1995) was a Yugoslav football goalkeeper who was a member of the Yugoslavia national team at the 1958 FIFA World Cup. However, he never earned a cap for his country.

Club career
With Dinamo Zagreb, Irović won the 1958 Yugoslav league title and three domestic cups in the 1960s. After a few years in Germany, he joined Austrian side Wacker Innsbruck in 1966, only to lose his place between the posts to Leo Tschenett.

Managerial career 
Irović was the head coach for Toronto Croatia in the National Soccer League in 1972.

Personal life

Death
Nicknamed Kamikaze, due to his habit of throwing himself at attackers, he died in 1995

References

External links

1934 births
1995 deaths
People from Herceg Novi
Association football goalkeepers
Yugoslav footballers
Yugoslav football managers 
1958 FIFA World Cup players
FK Velež Mostar players
GNK Dinamo Zagreb players
FSV Oggersheim players
FC Wacker Innsbruck players
Yugoslav First League players
Yugoslav expatriate footballers
Expatriate footballers in West Germany
Yugoslav expatriate sportspeople in West Germany
Expatriate footballers in Austria
Yugoslav expatriate sportspeople in Austria
Toronto Croatia managers
Canadian National Soccer League coaches
Yugoslav expatriate sportspeople in Canada
Expatriate soccer managers in Canada
Montenegrin footballers